Sergey Aleksandrovich Sivko (7 June 1940 – 10 November 1966) was a Russian amateur boxer. In 1960 he won the Soviet flyweight title and an Olympic silver medal. Next year he moved to the bantamweight division and won the Soviet and European titles. He died aged 26 in 1966. Since 1975, an annual boxing tournament has been held in his honor in Moscow.

References

1940 births
Soviet male boxers
Olympic boxers of the Soviet Union
Olympic silver medalists for the Soviet Union
Boxers at the 1960 Summer Olympics
1966 deaths
Olympic medalists in boxing
Russian male boxers
Medalists at the 1960 Summer Olympics
Bantamweight boxers
Sportspeople from Tula, Russia